Vijayam Manade is a 1970 Indian Telugu-language film, produced by N. Sambasiva Rao under the Rajendra Arts Productions banner and directed by B. Vittalacharya. It stars N. T. Rama Rao and B. Saroja Devi, with music composed by Ghantasala.

Plot 
The film begins in a prosperous village Ratnapuri, which is the border of two kingdoms Vijethapuram & Visalapuram. Ratnapuri is officially given to Vijethapuram three generations ago by Visalapuram with a written charter. But at present generation, Visalapuram's King Narendra Varma (Mukkamala) tries to grab the village because the entire grain required for the country is supplied by this village. During the time of harvest season, Visalapuram soldiers try to loot the grain when a young dynamic guy Pratap (N. T. Rama Rao) revolts against them and saves the village. After that, Pratap starts for Vijethapuram to negotiate with the king Vishnuvardhana Maharaju (Mikkilineni). On the way, Pratap saves Padmini Devi (B. Saroja Devi), the princess of Vijethapuri in disguise and takes her to the palace. Vishnuvardhana appreciates Pratap's loyalty and keeps the responsibility of safeguarding Ratnapuri to him. Pratap trains all the villagers as soldiers. At the same time, he falls in love with Padmini. Meanwhile, Vishnuvardhana sends their chief commander Ajay Simhudu (Satyanarayana) to  Ratnapuri but Narendra Varma bribes him and sends as his spy to Ratnapuri by the name Sippai Chinnaiah. In the village, Ajay traps Pratap's sister Madhavi (Devika) and marries her. After some time, when Madhavi becomes pregnant Ajay leaves to capital. Parallelly, Vishnuvardhana dies, handing over the charter to Padmini. Ajay tries to snatch it along with Padmini and the kingdom. Eventually, Pratap moves to the capital along with Madhavi to meet Ajay, leaving Madhavi at choultry and reaches the fort. Ajay senses it, so, he clearly takes Madhavi to a waterfall and throws her down. Fortunately, she was saved by Ajay's mother (Santha Kumari). After knowing of his sister's death, Pratap becomes depressed when Padmini consoles him and pleads him to save her kingdom. Meanwhile, Ajay makes a conspiracy to grab the kingdom and also plans to give away the charter to Nagendra Varma. Padmini escapes and reaches Pratap, both will somehow get back the charter. Once Ajay visits his house where he is surprised to see Madhavi with a baby boy. Here Ajay ploy makes Madhavi get charter from Pratap and also kidnaps Padmini. Ajay's mother learns it, as her husband is a true royal soldier, she stands for piety, reaches towards the fort along with Madhavi when Ajay is making the crowning ceremony. At that time, Pratap attacks the fort with the villagers, protects Padmini and reveals the charter to the public that Ratnapuri belongs only to Vijethapuram. In the final battle, people stamps out Narendra Varma, when Pratap is about to kill Ajay, Madhavi obstructs his way, but Ajay tries to backstab him, unfortunately, his mother comes between and dies. Then Ajay realises his mistake and asks Pratap to punish him, he leaves judgment to Padmini who gives him lifelong imprisonment at Ratnapuri as a protector. Finally, the movie ends on a happy note with the marriage of Pratap & Padmini.

Cast 
N. T. Rama Rao as Pratap
B. Saroja Devi as Padmini Devi
Satyanarayana as Ajay Simhudu
Mikkilineni as Vishnuvardhana Maharaju
Mukkamala as Nagendra Varma
Sridhar as Papanna
Nagesh as Sainyasi
Balakrishna as Suprabhatham
Jagga Rao as Ranadheer
Devika as Madhavi
Santha Kumari as Ajay's mother
Jyothi Lakshmi as Dancer
Meena Kumari as Parijatham

Soundtrack 

Music composed by Ghantasala.

References

External links 
 

Films based on folklore
Films scored by Ghantasala (musician)